Ronald P. Toby (1942 —   )  is an American historian, academic, writer and Japanologist.

Early life
Toby earned a doctorate in Japanese history from Columbia University in 1977.

Career
As a university professor, Toby's teaching experience has included the University of Illinois at Urbana-Champaign, the University of California at Berkeley, Keio University, and the University of Tokyo.

Toby's academic specialization focuses on issues having to do with pre- and early-modern Japan. His book State and Diplomacy in Early Modern Japan demonstrates that during the so-called "closed country" period in the Edo era, Japan was never truly closed to the outside world.

Select works
Tony's published writings encompass 52 works in 158 publications in 3 languages and 2,117 library holdings.

 2019 —   Engaging the Other: 'Japan' and Its Alter-Egos, 1550-1850 Leiden:Brill. ; OCLC 1066182857
 2004 —   Emergence of Economic Society in Japan, 1600-1870 with Hayami Akira and Osamu Saitō. Oxford: Oxford University Press. ;  OCLC 53388426
 1983 —  State and Diplomacy in Early Modern Japan: Asia in the Development of the Tokugawa Bakufu. Princeton: Princeton University Press. ;  OCLC 182640041
 1977 — The Early Tokugawa Bakufu and Seventeenth Century Japanese Relations with East Asia. Ph.D. thesis, Columbia University. OCLC 6909487
 1974 — Korean-Japanese Diplomacy in 1711: Sukchong's Court and the Shogun's Title.  M.A. thesis, Columbia University. OCLC 45788706

Notes

American Japanologists
Columbia University faculty
Academic staff of the University of Tokyo
Academic staff of Keio University
Columbia Graduate School of Arts and Sciences alumni
Living people
1942 births
21st-century American historians
21st-century American male writers
American male non-fiction writers